The 1987 Limerick Senior Hurling Championship was the 93rd staging of the Limerick Senior Hurling Championship since its establishment by the Limerick County Board.

Claughaun were the defending champions, however, they were defeated by Garryspillane in the first round.

On 13 September 1987, Patrickswell won the championship after a 1-17 to 3-10 defeat of Ballybrown in the final. It was their 10th championship title overall and their first title in three championship seasons.

Results

Final

References

Limerick Senior Hurling Championship
Limerick Senior Hurling Championship